Melinis is a genus of African and Arabian plants in the grass family.

The generic name is derived from the Greek meline meaning "millet".

 Species

 formerly included
numerous species now regarded as better suited to Tricholaena

References

Panicoideae
Poaceae genera